Fatma Beyaz (born April 16, 1995 in Istanbul, Turkey) is a Turkish volleyball player. She plays for Galatasaray HDI Sigorta.

Career

Galatasaray
On 14 May 2021, she signed a 2-year contract with the Galatasaray HDI Sigorta.

On 19 January 2023, she parted ways with Galatasaray HDI Sigorta.

References

External links
Player profile at Volleybox.net

1995 births
Volleyball players from Istanbul
Living people
Turkish women's volleyball players
Galatasaray S.K. (women's volleyball) players
Beşiktaş volleyballers
21st-century Turkish women